The 2018 Auckland Open (sponsored by ASB Bank) was a joint 2018 ATP World Tour and 2018 WTA Tour tennis tournament, played on outdoor hard courts. It was the 33rd edition of the women's event, and the 42nd edition of the men's event. It took place at the ASB Tennis Centre in Auckland, New Zealand, from 1 to 7 January 2018 for the women, and from 8 to 13 January 2018 for the men.

Points and prize money

Point distribution

Prize money 

1 Qualifiers' prize money is also the Round of 32 prize money
* per team

ATP singles main-draw entrants

Seeds 

1 Rankings as of January 1, 2018.

Other entrants 
The following players received wildcards into the singles main draw:
  Stefanos Tsitsipas
  Michael Venus
  Wu Yibing

The following players received entry from the qualifying draw:
  Radu Albot
  Rogério Dutra Silva
  Casper Ruud
  Tim Smyczek

The following players received entry as lucky losers:
  Liam Caruana
  Taro Daniel
  Lukáš Lacko
  Tennys Sandgren

Withdrawals 
Before the tournament
  Kyle Edmund → replaced by  Tennys Sandgren
  Ryan Harrison → replaced by  Liam Caruana
  Guido Pella → replaced by  Taro Daniel
  Andrey Rublev → replaced by  Lukáš Lacko

ATP doubles main-draw entrants

Seeds 

1 Rankings as of January 1, 2018.

Other entrants 
The following pairs received wildcards into the doubles main draw:
  Leander Paes /  Purav Raja
  Jack Sock /  Jackson Withrow

The following pair received entry as alternates:
  Radu Albot /  Tennys Sandgren

Withdrawals 
Before the tournament
  Guido Pella

During the tournament
  Pablo Cuevas

WTA singles main-draw entrants

Seeds 

1 Rankings as of December 25, 2017.

Other entrants 
The following players received wildcards into the singles main draw:
  Sara Errani
  Sofia Kenin
  Jade Lewis

The following players received entry from the qualifying draw:
  Ysaline Bonaventure
  Jana Fett
  Viktória Kužmová
  Sachia Vickery

WTA doubles main-draw entrants

Seeds 

1 Rankings as of December 25, 2017.

Other entrants 
The following pairs received wildcards into the doubles main draw:
  Paige Mary Hourigan /  Erin Routliffe
  Hsieh Shu-ying /  Jade Lewis

Champions

Men's singles 

  Roberto Bautista Agut def.  Juan Martín del Potro, 6–1, 4–6, 7–5

Women's singles 

  Julia Görges def.  Caroline Wozniacki, 6–4, 7–6(7–4)

Men's doubles 

  Oliver Marach /  Mate Pavić def.  Max Mirnyi /  Philipp Oswald, 6–4, 5–7, [10–7]

Women's doubles 

  Sara Errani /  Bibiane Schoofs def.  Eri Hozumi /  Miyu Kato, 7–5, 6–1

References

External links 
 

2018 ATP World Tour
2018 WTA Tour
2018
2018
2018 in New Zealand women's sport
January 2018 sports events in New Zealand
2018 in New Zealand tennis